Dave Huson is a retired footballer from Jersey who played professionally in the North American Soccer League and Major Indoor Soccer League.

In 1979, Huson signed with the California Surf of the North American Soccer League. In 1980, the Surf sent Huson to the Memphis Rogues. At the end of the season, Nelson Skalbania purchased the Rogues and moved them to Calgary renaming the team the Calgary Boomers. Huson then played the 1980–81 NASL indoor season with the Boomers before being traded to the Chicago Sting. On 20 March 1982, the Sting traded Huson, John Tyma and a 1983 third-round draft pick to the Tulsa Roughnecks in exchange for Duncan McKenzie. He was back in Chicago for the 1983 season and would remain there until he was released by the team in May 1985. He then moved to the Chicago Shoccers of the American Indoor Soccer Association. In February 1986, Huson took over as head coach of the Shoccers. In the fall of 1986, he returned to the Sting as head of community relations. In 1999, he became the head coach of the Rockford Raptors of the Premier Development League. He also coached the Deerfield High School boys' soccer team. He was inducted into the Illinois State Soccer Hall of Fame in 2002.

References

External links
 NASL/MISL stats

1951 births
Living people
American Indoor Soccer Association coaches
American Indoor Soccer Association players
Calgary Boomers players
California Surf players
Chicago Shoccers players
Chicago Sting (MISL) players
Chicago Sting (NASL) players
Memphis Rogues players
Major Indoor Soccer League (1978–1992) players
North American Soccer League (1968–1984) indoor players
North American Soccer League (1968–1984) players
Tulsa Roughnecks (1978–1984) players
Expatriate soccer players in the United States
Jersey footballers
Cape Town City F.C. (NFL) players
Expatriate soccer players in South Africa
Association football forwards
Jersey expatriates in Canada
Jersey expatriates in the United States
Jersey expatriates in South Africa
British expatriate sportspeople in Canada
British expatriate sportspeople in the United States
British expatriate sportspeople in South Africa
Expatriate soccer players in Canada
Jersey expatriate footballers
Jersey football managers
Association football defenders
Major Indoor Soccer League (1978–1992) commentators
National Football League (South Africa) players